The WWC World Tag Team Championship is the tag team title contested for in the Puerto Rican professional wrestling promotion, the World Wrestling Council.

History

Abroad (2017)
On February 11, 2017, Thunder and Lightning defended the WWC World Tag Team Championship against Stateline (Damien Angel and Eddie Taurus) in Lorain, Ohio, this as part of Cleveland Knights Championship Wrestling's Chase for the Grail event.

Local independent circuit (2018)

With WWC immersed in a hiatus following the passing of Hurricane Maria in September 2017, restricted licenses were granted to the talents in order to stay active. A direct consequence was that on January 6, 2018, the titles were defended for the first time in the Puerto Rican independent circuit. At CWA's Guerra de Reyes, incumbent champions La Revolución retained over the teams of La Familia Cubana, La Potencia and Akiles Falcón and Blackstone in a four-way match. On January 27, 2018, the champions made another appearance in the independent promotion when one of its members, El Comandante, faced Alejandro Marrero of Los Fujitivos. On February 24, 2018, four champion teams -La Revolución presenting WWC, Westside Mafia representing WWL, Los Fujitivos representing CWA and Smoke and Nightmare representing CWS- competed in a match where the team pinned would drop their titles to the winners. La Revolución was not involved in the result, which saw the CWA titlists best their CWS counterparts.

Title history

|-
!1
|align=center|The Fabulous Kangaroos
|February 26, 1977
|House show
|N/A
|1
|14
|align=left|
|
|-
!2
|align=center|Los Dinámicos(Carlos Colón and José Rivera)
|March 12, 1977
|House show
|Caguas, Puerto Rico
|1
|231
|
|
|-
!3
|align=center|The Samoans
|October 29, 1977
|House show
|Caguas, Puerto Rico
|1
|49
|
|
|-
!4
|align=center|Invader I and José Rivera (2)
|December 17, 1977
|House show
|San Juan, Puerto Rico
|1
|28
|
|
|-

|
|-
!5
|align=center|Invader I (2) and José Rivera (3)
|February 4, 1978
|House show
|San Juan, Puerto Rico
|2
|91
|align=left|.
|
|-
!6
|align=center|Huracán Castillo and Pierre Martel
|May 6, 1978
|House show
|Bayamón, Puerto Rico
|1
|21
|
|
|-
!7
|align=center|Invader I (3) and José Rivera (4)
|May 27, 1978
|House show
|Bayamón, Puerto Rico
|3
|149
|
|
|-
!8
|align=center|Kengo Kimura and Hiro Sasaki
|October 23, 1978
|House show
|Caguas, Puerto Rico
|1
|19
|
|
|-
!9
|align=center|The Invaders
|November 11, 1978
|House show
|Caguas, Puerto Rico
|1
|146
|
|
|-
!10
|align=center|The Funk Brothers
|April 6, 1979
|House show
|San Juan, Puerto Rico
|1
|232
|
|
|-
!11
|align=center|The Invaders
|November 24, 1979
|House show
|Bayamón, Puerto Rico
|2
|28
|
|
|-
!12
|align=center|The Funk Brothers
|December 22, 1979
|House Show
|Bayamón, Puerto Rico
|2
|861
|
|
|-
!13
|align=center|The Fabulous Kangaroos
|May 1, 1982
|House Show
|San Juan, Puerto Rico
|2
|55
|
|
|-
!14
|align=center|Invader I (6) and Pierre Martel (2)
|June 26, 1982
|House Show
|San Juan, Puerto Rico
|1
|29
|
|
|-
!15
|align=center|The Moondogs
|July 24, 1982
|House show
|San Juan, Puerto Rico
|1
|84
|
|
|-
!16
|align=center|Gino de la Serra and Pierre Martel (3)
|October 16, 1982
|House show
|San Juan, Puerto Rico
|1
|35
|
|
|-
!17
|align=center|Los Mercenarios
|November 20, 1982
|House show
|Bayamón, Puerto Rico
|1
|64
|
|
|-
!18
|align=center|Gran Apolo and Pierre Martel (4)
|January 23, 1983
|House show
|Ponce, Puerto Rico
|1
|20
|
|
|-
!19
|align=center|Scorpio and Mr. Tempest
|February 12, 1983
|House show
|Bayamón, Puerto Rico
|1
|30
|
|
|-

|-
!20
|align=center|Carlos Colón (2) and Pedro Morales
|April 30, 1983
|House show
|San Juan, Puerto Rico
|1
|133
|align=left|
|
|-
!21
|align=center|The Medics/The Super Médicos
|September 10, 1983
|House show
|Morovis, Puerto Rico
|1
|118
|align=left|
|
|-
!22
|align=center|Hercules Ayala and King Tonga
|January 6, 1984
|House show
|Morovis, Puerto Rico
|1
|22
|
|
|-
!23
|align=center|The Super Médicos
|January 28, 1984
|House show
|Guaynabo, Puerto Rico
|2
|88
|
|
|-
!24
|align=center|The Invaders
|April 25, 1984
|House show
|San Juan, Puerto Rico
|1
|101
|
|
|-
!25
|The Super Médicos
|August 4, 1984
|House show
|San Juan, Puerto Rico
|1
|65
|
|
|-

|-
!26
|The Invaders
|November 22, 1984
|House show
|Bayamón, Puerto Rico
|2
|16
|align=left|
|
|-
!27
|Black Gordman and Medic I (4)
|December 8, 1984
|House show
|Guaynabo, Puerto Rico
|1
|29
|
|
|-
!28
|The New York Rockers
|January 6, 1985
|House show
|San Juan, Puerto Rico
|1
|76
|
|
|-

|-
!29
|Ángel Mexicano and Fidel Sierra
|April 6, 1985
|House show
|San Juan, Puerto Rico
|1
|<1
|
|
|-

|-
!30
|The Rock 'n' Roll RPMs
|June 29, 1985
|House show
|San Juan, Puerto Rico
|1
|400
|align=left|
|
|-
!31
|Los Pastores
|August 3, 1986
|House show
|Bayamón, Puerto Rico
|1
|49
|
|
|-
!32
|The Rock 'n' Roll RPMs
|September 21, 1986
|House show
|San Juan, Puerto Rico
|2
|13
|
|
|-
!33
|The Starr Cousins
|October 4, 1986
|House show
|Caguas, Puerto Rico
|1
|94
|
|
|-
!34
|The Youngbloods
|January 6, 1987
|House show
|San Juan, Puerto Rico
|1
|88
|
|
|-
!35
|Los Pastores
|April 4, 1987
|House show
|Caguas, Puerto Rico
|2
|36
|
|
|-
!36
|The Youngbloods
|May 10, 1987
|House show
|San Juan, Puerto Rico
|2
|62
|
|
|-
!37
|Mr. Pogo and TNT
|July 11, 1987
|House show
|Caguas, Puerto Rico
|1
|19
|
|
|-
!38
|The Youngbloods
|July 30, 1987
|House show
|San Juan, Puerto Rico
|3
|27
|
|
|-
!39
|The Hunters
|August 26, 1987
|House show
|Port of Spain, Trinidad and Tobago
|1
|25
|align=left|
|
|-
!40
|The Youngbloods
|September 20, 1987
|WWC 14th Aniversario 1987 
|Ponce, Puerto Rico
|4
|27
|
|
|-
!41
|Kendo Nagasaki and Mr. Pogo (2)
|October 17, 1987
|House show
|Caguas, Puerto Rico
|1
|81
|
|
|-
!42
|The Invaders
|January 6, 1988
|House show
|San Juan, Puerto Rico
|3
|10
|
|
|-
!43
|Kendo Nagasaki (2) and Mr. Pogo (3)
|January 16, 1988
|House show
|Guaynabo, Puerto Rico
|2
|63
|
|
|-

|-
!44
|Kendo Nagasaki (3) and Mr. Pogo (4)
|April 12, 1988
|House show
|San Juan, Puerto Rico
|3
|32
|align=left|
|
|-
!45
|The Youngbloods
|May 14, 1988
|House show
|Caguas, Puerto Rico
|5
|70
|
|
|-
!46
|Kendo Nagasaki (4) and Mr. Pogo (5)
|July 23, 1988
|House show
|Arecibo, Puerto Rico 
|4
|14
|align=left|
|
|-
!47
|The Batten Twins
|August 6, 1988
|House show
|San Juan, Puerto Rico
|1
|71
|
|
|-
!48
|The Starr Cousins
|October 16, 1988
|House show
|Aquadilla, Puerto Rico
|2
|27
|
|
|-
!49
|The Batten Twins
|November 12, 1988
|House show
|Caguas, Puerto Rico
|2
|55
|
|
|-
!50
|Dan Kroffat and Tama
|January 6, 1989
|House show
|San Juan, Puerto Rico
|1
|57
|
|
|-
!51
|The Batten Twins
|March 4, 1989
|House show
|Bayamón, Puerto Rico
|3
|7
|
|
|-
!52
|Jason the Terrible and Steve Strong
|March 11, 1989
|House show
|Caguas, Puerto Rico
|1
|27
|
|
|-
!53
|Carlos Colón (3) and Invader I (10)
|April 7, 1989
|House show
|Juncos, Puerto Rico
|1
|40
|align=left|
|
|-
!54
|Abudda Dein and Rip Rogers
|May 17, 1989
|House show
|Vega Alta, Puerto Rico
|1
|60
|
|
|-
!55
|Puerto Rican Express
|July 16, 1989
|House show
|Mayagüez, Puerto Rico
|1
|20
|
|
|-
!56
|Abudda Dein and Rip Rogers
|August 5, 1989
|House show
|Juncos, Puerto Rico
|2
|63
|
|
|-
!57
|The Youngbloods
|October 7, 1989
|House show
|Bayamón, Puerto Rico
|6
|120
|
|
|-
!58
|Los Mercenarios
|February 4, 1990
|House show
|Aguadilla, Puerto Rico
|1
|55
|
|
|-
!59
|The Super Médicos
|March 31, 1990
|House show
|Caguas, Puerto Rico
|1
|126
|
|
|-
!60
|The Continental Dream
|August 4, 1990
|House show
|Caguas, Puerto Rico
|1
|42
|
|
|-
!61
|The Super Médicos
|September 15, 1990
|House show
|Bayamón, Puerto Rico
|2
|<1
|
|
|-

|-
!62
|The Super Médicos
|September 22, 1990
|House show
|Caguas, Puerto Rico
|3
|7
|align=left|
|
|-
!63
|The Texas Hangmen
|September 29, 1990
|House show
|Carolina, Puerto Rico
|1
|127
|
|
|-
!64
|El Bronco and Invader I (11)
|February 3, 1991
|House show
|Bayamón, Puerto Rico
|1
|7
|
|
|-
!65
|The Texas Hangmen
|February 10, 1991
|House show
|Hormigueros, Puerto Rico
|2
|20
|
|
|-
!66
|El Bronco (2) and Invader I (12)
|March 2, 1991
|House show
|Bayamón, Puerto Rico
|2
|81
|align=left|
|
|-
!67
|El Gran Mendoza and Billy Travis
|May 22, 1991
|House show
|San Juan, Puerto Rico
|1
|21
|
|
|-
!68
|Puerto Rican Express
|June 8, 1991
|House show
|San Juan, Puerto Rico
|2
|22
|
|
|-
!69
|El Bronco (3) and Invader I (13)
|July 2, 1991
|House show
|Carolina, Puerto Rico 
|3
|158
|align=left| 
|
|-
!70
|The Heartbreakers
|November 29, 1991
|House show
|Willemstad, Curaçao
|1
|26
|align=left|
|
|-
!71
|Rex King and Ricky Santana
|December 25, 1991
|House show
|San Juan, Puerto Rico
|1
|12
|
|
|-
!72
|The Heartbreakers
|January 6, 1992
|House show
|San Juan, Puerto Rico
|2
|54
|
|
|-
!73
|Rex King (2) and Ricky Santana (2)
|February 29, 1992
|House show
|Caguas, Puerto Rico
|2
|1
|
|
|-
!74
|The Heartbreakers
|March 1, 1992
|House show
|Mayagüez, Puerto Rico
|3
|15
|
|
|-
!75
|Heartbreaker Adonis (4) and Doug Masters
|March 15, 1992
|House show
|N/A
|1
|5
|align=left|
|
|-
!76
|El Bronco (4) and Ciclón Salvadoreño
|March 21, 1992
|House show
|Humacao, Puerto Rico
|1
|21
|
|
|-
!77
|Doug Masters (2) and Ron Starr (4)
|April 11, 1992
|House show
|Caguas, Puerto Rico
|1
|35
|
|
|-

|-
!78
|Doug Masters (3) and Ron Starr (5)
|May 24, 1992
|House show
|San Germán, Puerto Rico
|2
|31
|align=left|
|
|-
!79
|The Southern Rockers
|June 24, 1992
|House show
|Dorado, Puerto Rico
|1
|38
|
|
|-

|-
!80
|Ray González and Rex King (4)
|September 19, 1992
|House show
|Carolina, Puerto Rico
|1
|97
|align=left|
|
|-
!81
|Mohammed Hussein and El Vigilante (4)
|December 25, 1992
|House show
|Bayamón, Puerto Rico
|1
|58
|align=left|
|
|-
!82
|Los Originales Nenes de las Nenas
|February 21, 1993
|House show
|Bayamón, Puerto Rico
|1
|9
|
|
|-
!83
|The Batten Twins
|March 2, 1993
|House show
|San Juan, Puerto Rico
|4
|31
|
|
|-

|-
!84
|Los Originales Nenes de las Nenas
|April 4, 1993
|House show
|San Juan, Puerto Rico
|2
|76
|align=left|
|
|-
!85
|Mohammed Hussein (2) and Dusty Wolfe
|June 19, 1993
|House show
|Bayamón, Puerto Rico
|1
|127
|
|
|-
!86
|Mohammed Hussein (3) and Doug Sanders
|October 23, 1993 
|House show
|N/A
|1
|36
|align=left| 
|
|-
!87
|Mohammed Hussein (4) and Dusty Wolfe (2)
|November 27, 1993
|House show
|N/A
|2
|8
|align=left|
|
|-
!88
|El Bronco (5) and Ray González (4)
|December 4, 1993
|House show
|Trujillo Alto, Puerto Rico
|1
|92
|
|
|-
!89
|Huracán Castillo, Jr. (3) and Mohammad Hussein (5)
|March 6, 1994
|House show
|Bayamón, Puerto Rico
|1
|90
|
|
|-

|-
!90
|Mohammed Hussein (6) and The Tahitian Warrior
|June 25, 1994
|House show
|Caguas, Puerto Rico
|1
|11
|align=left|
|
|-
!91
|El Bronco (6) and Ray González (5)
|July 6, 1994
|House show
|Toa Alta, Puerto Rico
|2
|18
|
|
|-
!92
|The Wildcats
|July 24, 1994
|House show
|Mayagüez, Puerto Rico
|1
|6
|
|
|-
!93
|La Conexión Comunista
|July 30, 1994
|House show
|Toa Alta, Puerto Rico
|1
|13
|
|
|-
!94
|El Bronco (7) and Ray González (6)
|August 12, 1994
|House show
|Manati, Puerto Rico
|3
|1
|
|
|-
!95
|Mohammed Hussein (8) and The Tahitian Warrior (2)
|August 13, 1994
|House show
|Trujillo Alto, Puerto Rico
|2
|11
|align=left|
|
|-
!96
|The Wildcats
|August 24, 1994
|House show
|Toa Alta, Puerto Rico
|2
|7
|
|
|-
!97
|Mohammed Hussein (7) and The Tahitian Warrior (3)
|August 31, 1994
|House show
|N/A
|3
|30
|
|
|-
!98
|Huracán Castillo, Jr. (4) and Ray González (7)
|October 30, 1994
|House show
|N/A
|1
|68
|
|
|-
!99
|La Conexión Cubana
|January 6, 1995
|House show
|N/A
|1
|56
|
|
|-
!100
|Huracán Castillo, Jr. (5) and Ray González (8)
|March 3, 1995
|House show
|N/A
|1
|106
|
|
|-
!101
|The Canadian Glamour Boys
|June 17, 1995
|House show
|N/A
|1
|57
|
|
|-
!102
|Huracán Castillo, Jr. (6) and Invader I (14)
|August 13, 1995
|House show
|Caguas, Puerto Rico
|1
|70
|
|
|-
!103
|Overkill 
|October 22, 1995
|House show
|San Germán, Puerto Rico
|1
|35
|
|
|-
!104
|The Canadian Glamour Boys
|November 26, 1995
|House show
|Caguas, Puerto Rico
|1
|104
|
|
|-
!105
|Huracán Castillo, Jr. (7) and Ray González (9)
|March 9, 1996
|House show
|N/A
|3
|28
|
|
|-
!106
|The Canadian Glamour Boys
|April 6, 1996
|House show
|N/A
|2
|28
|
|
|-
!107
|Ray González (10) and Ricky Santana (6)
|May 4, 1996
|House show
|Caguas, Puerto Rico
|1
|140
|
|
|-
!108
|The Texas Hangmen
|September 21, 1996
|House show
|N/A
|3
|161
|
|
|-
!109
|Texas Hangmen
|March 1, 1997
|House show
|Cayey, Puerto Rico 
|1
|1
|align=left|
|
|-
!110
|La Ley (2) and Ricky Santana (7)
|March 2, 1997
|House show
|Cabo Rojo, Puerto Rico
|1
|113
|
|
|-
!111
|The Islanders
|June 22, 1997
|House show
|Bayamón, Puerto Rico 
|1
|55
|align=left|Tahiti was previously known as The Tahitian Warrior.
|
|-
!112
|The Youngbloods
|August 16, 1997
|House show
|Bayamón, Puerto Rico
|7
|186
|align=left|
|
|-

|-
!113
|Glamour Boy Shane (3) and Ricky Santana (8)
|March 22, 1998
|House show
|Caguas, Puerto Rico
|1
|343
|align=left|
|
|-
!114
|Starr Corporation
|February 28, 1999
|House show
|Cabo Rojo, Puerto Rico
|1
|84
|
|
|-
!115
|The Huertas Brothers/The Invaders
|October 9, 1999
|House show
|Guaynabo, Puerto Rico
|1
|63
|
|
|-
!116
|Starr Corporation
|December 11, 1999
|House show
|Cabo Rojo, Puerto Rico
|1
|84
|
|
|-

|-
!117
|Black Boy and José Rivera, Jr.
|March 11, 2000
|House show
|Guaynabo, Puerto Rico
|1
|28
|
|
|-
!118
|Bouncer Bruno (2) and Dutch Mantel
|April 8, 2000
|House show
|Guaynabo, Puerto Rico
|1
|21
|
|
|-
!119
|Artillería Pesada
|April 29, 2000
|House show
|Caguas, Puerto Rico
|1
|126
|
|
|-
!120
|The Windham Brothers
|September 2, 2000
|House show
|Carolina, Puerto Rico
|1
|105
|
|
|-
!121
|Artillería Pesada
|December 16, 2000
|House show
|Carolina, Puerto Rico
|2
|77
|
|
|-
!122
|Rico Suave and Eddie Watts
|March 3, 2001
|House show
|Carolina, Puerto Rico
|1
|56
|
|
|-
!123
|Artillería Pesada
|April 28, 2001
|House show
|Cayey, Puerto Rico
|3
|42
|
|
|-
!124
|Ricky Santana (9) and Rico Suave (2)
|June 9, 2001
|House show
|Cayey, Puerto Rico
|1
|21
|
|
|-
!125
|The Rastamen
|June 30, 2001
|House show
|Arecibo, Puerto Rico
|1
|15
|
|
|-
!126
|Artillería Pesada
|July 14, 2001
|House show
|Cayey, Puerto Rico
|4
|97
|
|
|-

|-
!127
|El Bronco (8) and Super Gladiador 
|November 3, 2001
|House show
|Carolina, Puerto Rico
|1
|21
|align=left|
|
|-
!128
|Artillería Pesada
|November 24, 2001
|House show
|Caguas, Puerto Rico
|5
|112
|
|
|-
!129
|Carly Colón and Eddie Colón
|March 16, 2002
|House show
|Caguas, Puerto Rico
|1
|1
|
|
|-
!130
|Artillería Pesada
|March 17, 2002
|House show
|Yauco, Puerto Rico
|6
|70
|
|
|-
!131
|Carly Colón (2) and Konnan
|May 26, 2002
|House show
|Caguas, Puerto Rico
|1
|76
|
|
|-
!132
|Artillería Pesada
|August 10, 2002
|House show
|Humacao, Puerto Rico
|7
|119
|
|
|-
!133
|The Tahitians
|December 7, 2002
|House show
|Coamo, Puerto Rico
|1
|113
|
|
|-
!134
|Artillería Pesada
|March 30, 2003
|House show
|Salinas, Puerto Rico
|8
|34
|
|
|-

|-
!135
|Los Broncos 
|May 10, 2003
|House show
|Caguas, Puerto Rico
|1
|8
|
|
|-
!136
|Artillería Pesada
|May 18, 2003
|House show
|Carolina, Puerto Rico
|9
|20
|
|
|-
!137
|Los Broncos 
|June 7, 2003
|House show
|Cayey, Puerto Rico
|2
|42
|
|
|-
!138
|La Conexión Cubana
|July 19, 2003
|House show
|Carolina, Puerto Rico
|2
|22
|
|
|-
!139
|Los Broncos
|August 10, 2003
|House show
|Caguas, Puerto Rico
|3
|6
|
|
|-
!140
|Brent Dail and Ricky Santana (11)
|August 16, 2003
|House show
|Nagüabo, Puerto Rico
|1
|7
|
|
|-
!141
|Los Broncos
|August 23, 2003
|House show
|Caguas, Puerto Rico
|4
|15
|
|
|-
!142
|Artillería Pesada
|September 7, 2003
|House show
|Guayanilla, Puerto Rico
|10
|96
|
|
|-

|-
!143
|Super Gladiador (2) and Vengador Boricua 
|January 4, 2004
|House show
|Manatí, Puerto Rico
|1
|95
|align=left|
|
|-
!144
|Super Gladiador (3) and Brent Dail (2)
|April 8, 2004
|House show
|Nagüabo, Puerto Rico
|1
|2
|align=left|
|
|-
!145
|Agente Bruno (3)and Rico Suave (3)
|April 10, 2004
|House show
|Nagüabo, Puerto Rico
|1
|35
|
|
|-
!146
|Los Nuevos Nenes De las Nenas
|May 8, 2004
|House show
|Caguas, Puerto Rico
|1
|28
|
|
|-
!147
|Diabólico and Rico Suave (4)
|June 5, 2004
|House show
|Caguas, Puerto Rico
|1
|38
|
|
|-
!148
|Los Nuevos Nenes De las Nenas
|July 13, 2004
|House show
|San Juan, Puerto Rico
|2
|39
|
|
|-
!149
|Delta Force
|August 18, 2004
|House show
|Caguas, Puerto Rico
|1
|96
|align=left|
|
|-
!150
|Viper (6) and El Rebelde
|November 25, 2004
|House show
|Caguas, Puerto Rico
|1
|<1
|align=left|
|
|-
!151
|The Starr Corporation
|November 25, 2004
|House show
|Caguas, Puerto Rico
|1
|16
|
|
|-
!152
|The New Delta Force
|December 11, 2004
|House show
|Caguas, Puerto Rico
|1
|26
|
|
|-
!153
|The Starr Corporation
|January 6, 2005
|House show
|Caguas, Puerto Rico
|2
|16
|
|
|-
!154
|Diabólico (2) and Rico Suave (5)
|January 22, 2005
|House show
|Caguas, Puerto Rico
|2
|7
|
|
|-
!155
|The Starr Corporation
|January 29, 2005
|House show
|Caguas, Puerto Rico
|3
|7
|
|
|-
!156
|La Doble D Dominicana
|February 5, 2005
|House show
|Caguas, Puerto Rico
|1
|70
|align=left|
|
|-
!157
|El Bronco (9) and Diamante Dominicano (3)
|March 17, 2005
|House show
|Humacao, Puerto Rico
|1
|30
|align=left|
|
|-
!158
|Delta Force
|April 16, 2005
|WWC Friday Madness 
|Gurabo, Puerto Rico
|2
|42
|
|
|-
!159
|Alex Montalvo (3) and Chicky Starr (7)
|May 28, 2005
|House show
|Gurabo, Puerto Rico
|1
|28
|
|
|-
!160
|Delta Force 
|June 25, 2005
|House show
|Florida, Puerto Rico
|3
|14
|
|
|-
!161
|Joe Bravo and Vengador Boricua (2)
|July 9, 2005
|House show
|Salinas, Puerto Rico
|1
|70
|
|
|-
!162
|Eric Alexander and Rico Suave (6)
|September 17, 2005
|House show
|Salinas, Puerto Rico
|1
|21
|
|
|-
!163
|Joe Bravo (2) and Vengador Boricua (3)
|October 8, 2005
|House show
|Ponce, Puerto Rico
|2
|28
|
|
|-
!164
|Salt 'n' Pepper
|November 5, 2005
|WWC 32nd Aniversario 2005
|Bayamón, Puerto Rico
|1
|28
|
|
|-
!165
|Chris Joel (3) and Demolition X
|December 3, 2005
|House show
|Cayey, Puerto Rico
|1
|50
| 
|| 
|-

|-
!166
|Los Nuevos Nenes de las Nenas
|February 4, 2006
|WWC La Hora de la Verdad III
|Bayamón, Puerto Rico
|1
|49
|align=left|
|
|-
!167
|Cassidy Riley and James Storm
|March 25, 2006
|WWC Honor vs. Traicion III 
|Carolina, Puerto Rico
|1
|69
|
|
|-
!168
|America's Most Wanted 
|June 2, 2006
|N/A
|Vega Baja, Puerto Rico 
|1
|1
|align=left| 
|
|-
!169
|El Poder Supremo
|June 3, 2006
|WWC Summer Madness Tour 2006 
|Carolina, Puerto Rico
|1
|70
|
|
|-
!170
|The New Starr Corporation
|August 12, 2006
|WWC 33rd Aniversario 2006
|Bayamón, Puerto Rico
|1
|22
|
|
|-
!171
|El Poder Supremo
|September 3, 2006
|WWC Septiembre Negro Tour
|Bayamón, Puerto Rico
|2
|34
|
|
|-
!172
|The New Starr Corporation
|October 7, 2006
|House show
|Bayamón, Puerto Rico
|2
|47
|
|
|-
!173
|Terror, Inc.
|November 23, 2006
|WWC Crossfire 
|Carolina, Puerto Rico
|1
|58
|
|
|-
!174
|Noriega and Jose Rivera, Jr. (2)
|January 20, 2007
|House show
|Manatí, Puerto Rico
|1
|21
|align=left|
|
|-
!175
|Juventud Rebelde
|February 10, 2007
|House show
|Manatí, Puerto Rico 
|1
|35
|align=left|
|
|-
!176
|Terror, Inc.
|March 17, 2007
|WWC Camino A La Gloria 2007
|Bayamón, Puerto Rico
|2
|42
|
|
|-
!177
|Juventud Rebelde
|April 28, 2007
|House show
|Bayamón, Puerto Rico
|2
|14
|
|
|-
!178
|Los Compadres
|May 12, 2007
|House show
|Bayamón, Puerto Rico
|1
|42
|
|
|-
!179
|Juventud Rebelde
|June 23, 2007
|House show
|Bayamón, Puerto Rico
|3
|35
|align=left|
|
|-
!180
|La Legion del Armagedon
|July 28, 2007
|House show
|Bayamón, Puerto Rico
|1
|50
|
|
|-
!181
|Artillería Pesada
|September 15, 2007
|WWC La Veganza Septiembre Negro Tour
|Caguas, Puerto Rico
|11
|69
|align=left|
|
|-
!182
|Juventud Rebelde
|November 24, 2007
|House show
|Bayamón, Puerto Rico
|4
|43
|
|
|-
!183
|Artillería Pesada
|January 6, 2008
|WWC Euphoria Tour 2008
|San Juan, Puerto Rico
|12
|20
|align=left|
|
|-
!185
|Juventud Rebelde
|January 26, 2008
|House show
|Hatillo, Puerto Rico
|5
|7
|align=left|
|
|-
!186
|Artillería Pesada
|February 2, 2008
|House show
|Lares, Puerto Rico
|13
|14
|
|
|-
!187
|The Texas Outlaws
|February 16, 2008
|House show
|Yauco, Puerto Rico
|1
|14
|
|
|-
!188
|Artillería Pesada
|March 1, 2008
|House show
|Toa Baja, Puerto Rico 
|14
|14
|align=left|
|
|-
!189
|The Texas Outlaws
|March 15, 2008
|House show
|Lares, Puerto Rico
|2
|7
|
|
|-
!190
|Artillería Pesada
|March 22, 2008
|WWC Camino A La Gloria Tour
|Bayamón, Puerto Rico
|15
|1
|
|
|-
!191
|Juventud Rebelde
|March 23, 2008
|WWC Camino A La Gloria Tour
|Manatí, Puerto Rico
|6
|28
|
|
|-
!192
|Artillería Pesada
|April 20, 2008
|House show
|Quebradillas, Puerto Rico
|16
|6
|align=left|
|
|-
!193
|The New Texas Outlaws
|April 26, 2008
|House show
|Bayamón, Puerto Rico
|1
|84
|
|
|-
!194
|D'Jour Twins
|July 19, 2008
|WWC 35th Aniversario 2008
|San Juan, Puerto Rico
|1
|21
|
|
|-
!195
|The New Texas Outlaws
|August 9, 2008
|House show
|Carolina, Puerto Rico
|2
|35
|
|
|-
!196
|Artillería Pesada
|September 13, 2008
|House show
|Nagüabo, Puerto Rico
|17
|7
|
|
|-
!197
|Los Renegados del Infierno
|September 20, 2008
|WWC Septiembre Negro
|Bayamón, Puerto Rico
|2
|21
|align=left| 
|
|-
!198
|Artillería Pesada
|October 11, 2008
|House show
|Bayamón, Puerto Rico 
|18
|91
|align=left|
|
|-
!199
|La Evolución Hardcore
|January 10, 2009
|House show
|Bayamón, Puerto Rico
|1
|56
|
|
|-
!200
|Artillería Pesada
|March 7, 2009
|House show
|Bayamón, Puerto Rico 
|19
|161
|align=left|
|
|-
!201
|The American Family
|August 15, 2009
|WWC Summer Madness Tour 
|Bayamón, Puerto Rico
|1
|77
|
|
|-
!202
|Artillería Pesada
|October 31, 2009
|WWC Halloween Wrestling Xtravaganza Tour 
|Bayamón, Puerto Rico
|20
|77
|align=left|
|
|-
!203
|
|January 16, 2010
|WWC Euphoria Mega Event 
|San Juan, Puerto Rico
|1
|35
|
|
|-
!204
|Chicano (2) and Idol Stevens (2)
|February 20, 2010
|House show
|Bayamón, Puerto Rico
|1
|21
|align=left| 
|
|-
!205
|Artillería Pesada
|March 13, 2010
|House show
|Caguas, Puerto Rico
|21
|22
|
|
|-
!206
|The New American Family
|April 4, 2010
|House show
|Aguadilla, Puerto Rico 
|1
|20
|align=left|
|
|-
!207
|Los Aéreos
|April 24, 2010
|WWC Honor Vs. Traicion 2010 
|Bayamón, Puerto Rico
|1
|48
|
|
|-
!208
|Idol Stevens (4) and Abbad
|June 11, 2010
|House show
|Ponce, Puerto Rico
|1
|30
|
|
|-
!209
|Artillería Pesada
|July 11, 2010
|WWC 37th Aniversario 2010 Weekend
|Bayamón, Puerto Rico 
|22
|76
|align=left|
|
|-
!210
|Zona Urbana
|September 25, 2010
|House show
|Bayamón, Puerto Rico
|1
|7
|
|
|-
!211
|Artillería Pesada
|October 2, 2010
|House show
|Bayamón, Puerto Rico
|23
|21
|align=left|
|
|-
!212
|Zona Urbana
|October 23, 2010
|House show
|Bayamón, Puerto Rico
|2
|7
|
|
|-
!213
|Artillería Pesada
|October 30, 2010
|House show
|Manatí, Puerto Rico
|24
|43
|align=left|
|
|-
!214
|Los Rabiosos
|December 12, 2010
|WWC Euforia 2011
|Bayamón, Puerto Rico
|1
|34
|
|
|-
!215
|Artillería Pesada
|January 15, 2011
|House show
|Bayamón, Puerto Rico
|25
|7
|
|
|-
!216
|Los Rabiosos
|January 22, 2011
|House show
|Bayamón, Puerto Rico
|2
|27
|align=left|
|
|-
!217
|Black Pain (3) and Mad Man Manson
|February 19, 2011
|House show
|Carolina, Puerto Rico
|1
|35
|
|
|-
!218
|Los Rabiosos
|March 26, 2011
|House show
|Carolina, Puerto Rico
|3
|35
|align=left|
|
|-
!219
|BJ (3) and Joe Bravo (3)
|April 30, 2011
|House show
|Cataño, Puerto Rico
|1
|42
|align=left|
|
|-
!220
|Los Fugitivos de la Calle
|June 11, 2011
|House show
|Carolina, Puerto Rico
|1
|84
|align=left|
|
|-
!221
|Tommy Diablo and Johnny Ringo
|September 3, 2011
|House show
|Bayamón, Puerto Rico
|1
|7
|
|
|-
!222
|Los Fugitivos de la Calle
|September 10, 2011
|House show
|Carolina, Puerto Rico
|2
|14
|
|
|-

|-
!223
|Los Fugitivos de La Calle
|November 5, 2011
|House show
|Santurce, Puerto Rico
|3
|63
|
|
|-
!224
|The Máximos Bros.
|January 7, 2012
|WWC Euphoria Tour 2012 
|Bayamón, Puerto Rico
|1
|70
|
|
|-
!225
|Los Fugitivos de la Calle
|March 17, 2012
|House show
|Bayamón, Puerto Rico
|4
|35
|align=left|
|
|-
!226
|El Nuevo Mando
|April 21, 2012
|House show
|Santurce, Puerto Rico
|1
|49
|
|
|-
!227
|Los Arcángeles
|June 9, 2012
|House show
|Cataño, Puerto Rico
|1
|35
|
|
|-
!228
|El Nuevo Mando
|July 14, 2012
|House show
|Guaynabo, Puerto Rico
|1
|20
|align=left|
|
|-

|-
!229
|Artillería Pesada
|December 9, 2012
|WWC Lockout
|Bayamón, Puerto Rico
|26
|62
|align=left|
|
|-
!230
|The Sons of Samoa
|February 9, 2013
|House show
|Cataño, Puerto Rico
|1
|49
|align=left|
|
|-
!231
|Artillería Pesada
|March 30, 2013
|WWC Camino A La Gloria
|Bayamón, Puerto Rico
|27
|22
|
|-
!232
|Andy Leavine and Samson Walker
|April 21, 2013
|House show
|Cataño, Puerto Rico
|1
|69
|
|
|-
!233
|The Sons of Samoa
|June 29, 2013
|WWC Summer Madness
|Caguas, Puerto Rico
|2
|85
|align=left|
|
|-
!234
|Zona 101
|September 22, 2013
|House show
|Bayamón, Puerto Rico
|1
|55
|align=left|
|
|-
!235
|The Sons of Samoa
|November 16, 2013
|WWC Crossfire Day 1
|Bayamón, Puerto Rico
|3
|50
|
| 
|-
!236
|Chicano (6) and Xix Xavant
|January 5, 2014
|WWC Euphoria Day 2
|Bayamón, Puerto Rico
|1
|104
|
| 
|-
!237
|Los Templarios
|April 19, 2014
|WWC Camino A La Gloria
|Bayamón, Puerto Rico
|1
|64
|
|
|-
!238
|Los Boricuas
|June 22, 2014
|House show
|Bayamón, Puerto Rico
|1
|27
|
|
|-

|-
!239
|Los Templarios
|August 16, 2014
|House show
|Bayamón, Puerto Rico
|2
|112
|align=left|
|
|-
!240
|Los Boricuas
|December 6, 2014
|WWC Lockdown Day 2
|Bayamón, Puerto Rico
|2
|84
|align=left|
|
|-

|-
!241
|La Revolución
|March 14, 2015
|House show
|Bayamón, Puerto Rico
|1
|154
|align=left|
|
|-
!242
|El Hijo de Ray González and Mike Mendoza
|August 15, 2015
|House show
|Bayamón, Puerto Rico
|1
|21
|
|
|-
!243
|La Revolución
|September 5, 2015
|House show
|Cataño, Puerto Rico
|2
|183
|
|
|-
!244
|Juventud Extrema
|March 6, 2016
|House show
|Bayamón, Puerto Rico
|1
|10
|
|
|-

|- 
!245
|Juventud Extrema
|March 26, 2016
|House show
|Bayamón, Puerto Rico
|2
|35
| 
|
|- 
!246
|La Revolución
|April 30, 2016
|House show
|Bayamón, Puerto Rico
|1
|1
|
|
|- 
!247
|Juventud Extrema
|May 28, 2016
|House show
|Bayamón, Puerto Rico
|3
|28
|
|
|- 
!248
|La Revolución
|June 25, 2016
|House show
|Caguas, Puerto Rico
|2
|161
|
|
|-
!249
|Artillería Pesada
|December 3, 2016
|WWC Superestrellas de la Lucha Libre Sabado 
|Carolina, Puerto Rico
|28
|77
|
|
|-
!250
|La Revolución
|February 18, 2017
|WWC Superestrellas de la Lucha Libre Domingo
|Bayamón, Puerto Rico
|3
|98
|
|
|-
!251
|El Cuervo (5) and El Hombre Bestia Angel (2)
|May 27, 2017
|House show
|Bayamón, Puerto Rico
|1
|49
|
|
|-
!252
|La Revolución
|July 15, 2017
|House show
|Bayamón, Puerto Rico
|4
|259
|
|
|-
!253
|Khaos and Abbadon
|March 31, 2018
|WWC Camino A La Gloria Day 1
|Manati, Puerto Rico
|1
|70
|
|
|-
!254
|La Revolución
|June 9, 2018
|WWC La Hora De La Verdad 2018
|Guaynabo, Puerto Rico
|5
|129
|
|
|-
!255
|Gilbert and Pedro Portillo
|October 16, 2018
|House show
|Luquillo, Puerto Rico
|1
|18
|
|
|-
!256
|Artillería Pesada
|November 3, 2018
|House show
|Luquillo, Puerto Rico
|29
|147
|
|
|-
!257
|La Revolución
|March 30, 2019
|House show
|Morovis, Puerto Rico
|6
|49
|Defeated La Artillería Pesada and Doom Patrol: Cold and Death Warrant in a 3-way match.
|
|-
!258
|Doom Patrol 
|May 18, 2019
|House show
|Toa Alta, Puerto Rico
|1
|35
|
|
|-
!259
|Chicano (7) and Xix Xavant (2)
|June 22, 2019
|House show
|Manatí, Puerto Rico
|2
|21
|
|
|-
!260
|Doom Patrol 
|July 13, 2019
|WWC Honor Vs Traicion 2019
|Toa Alta, Puerto Rico
|2
|35
|
|
|-
!261
|La Revolución
|August 17, 2019
|WWC Aniversario 46 Day 2
|Guaynabo, Puerto Rico
|7
|112
|Defeated Doom Patrol, La Potencia, Steve Joel and Jay Velez, and Clan Freedom in a 5-way match.
|
|-
!262
|Khaos and Abaddon
|December 7, 2019
|WWC Lockout 2019
|Bayamón, Puerto Rico
|2
|428
|
|
|-
!263
|La Formula
|February 7, 2021
|WWC Cuentas Pendientes
|San Juan, Puerto Rico
|1
|
|
|
|}

Combined reigns 

{| class="wikitable sortable" style="text-align: center"
|-
!Rank
!Team
!No. ofreigns
!Combined days
|-
!1
| Artillería Pesada || 29 || 1,731
|-
!2
| The Funk Brothers || 2 || 1,061
|-
!3
|La Revolución || 7 || 809
|-
!4
| The Youngbloods || 7 || 580
|-
!5
|Khaos and Abaddon || 2 || 498
|-
!6
| The Rock 'n' Roll RPMs || 2 || 413
|-
!7
| Glamour Boy Shane and Ricky Santana || 1 || 343
|-
!8
| The Texas Hangmen || 3 || 308
|-
!9
| La Revolución || 2 || 337
|-
!10
| Invader I and José Rivera || 3 || 268
|-
!11
| Los Dinámicos || 1 || 231
|-
!12
| El Bronco and Invader I || 3 || 220
|-
!13
| The Medics/The Super Médicos || 2 || 206
|-
!14
| style="background:#ffe6bd;"| La Formula † || 1 || +
|-
!15
| Huracán Castillo, Jr. and Ray González || 3 || 202
|-
!16
| Los Fugitivos de la Calle || 4 || 196
|-
!17
| Kendo Nagasaki  and Mr. Pogo || 4 || 190
|-
!18
| The Sons of Samoa || 3 || 184
|-
!19
| Los Templarios || 2 || 176
|-
!20
| The Invaders || 2 || 174
|-
!21
| The Batten Twins || 4 || 164
|-
!22
| Juventud Rebelde || 6 || 162
|-
!23
| Delta Force  || 3 || 152
|-
!24
| Ray González and Ricky Santana || 1 || 140
|-
!25
| Mohammed Hussein and Dusty Wolfe || 2 || 135
|-
!26
| Carlos Colón and Pedro Morales || 1 || 133
|-
!27
| Chicano and Xix Xavant || 2 || 125
|-
!28
| Abudda Dein and Rip Rogers || 2 || 123
|-
!29
| The Starr Cousins || 2 || 121
|-
!30
| The New Texas Outlaws || 2 || 119
|-
!31
| The Invaders || 2 || 117
|-
!32
| Los Pastores || 2 || 115
|-
!rowspan=2|33
| La Ley and Ricky Santana || 1 || 113
|-
| The Tahitians || 1 || 113
|-
!34
| El Bronco and Ray González || 3 || 111
|-
!35
| Los Boricuas || 2 || 111
|-
!36
| The Windham Brothers || 1 || 105
|-
!37
| El Poder Supremo || 2 || 104
|-
!38
| The Canadian Glamour Boys || 1 || 104
|-
!39
| Terror, Inc. || 2 || 100
|-
!40
| Joe Bravo and Vengador Boricua || 2 || 98
|-
!41
| Ray González and Rex King || 1 || 97
|-
!42
| Los Rabiosos || 3 || 96
|-
!43
| The Heartbreakers || 3 || 95
|-
!44
| Super Gladiador and Vengador Boricua  || 1 || 95
|-
!45
| Huracán Castillo, Jr. and Mohammad Hussein || 1 || 90
|-
!rowspan=2|46
| Los Originales Nenes de las Nenas || 2 || 85
|-
| The Canadian Glamour Boys || 2 || 85
|-
!rowspan=3|47
| Starr Corporation || 1 || 84
|-
| Starr Corporation || 1 || 84
|-
| The Moondogs || 1 || 84
|-
!48
| La Conexión Cubana || 2 || 78
|-
!49
| The American Family || 1 || 77
|-
!rowspan=2|50
| Carly Colón and Konnan || 1 || 76
|-
| The New York Rockers || 1 || 76
|-
!51
| Juventud Extrema || 3 || 73
|-
!52
| Los Broncos || 4 || 71
|-
!53
| Los Renegados del Infierno/La Legion del Armagedon || 2 || 71
|-
!54
| Doom Patrol  || 2 || 70
|-
!rowspan=3|55
| Huracán Castillo, Jr. and Invader I || 1 || 70
|-
| La Doble D Dominicana || 1 || 70
|-
| The Máximos Bros. || 1 || 70
|-
!rowspan=3|56
| Cassidy Riley and James Storm || 1 || 69
|-
| The Fabulous Kangaroos || 2 || 69
|-
| The New Starr Corporation || 2 || 69
|-
!57
| Andy Leavine and Samson Walker || 1 || 69
|-
!58
| Los Nuevos Nenes De las Nenas || 2 || 67
|-
!59
| Doug Masters and Ron Starr || 2 || 66
|-
!60
| The Super Médicos || 1 || 65
|-
!61
| Los Mercenarios || 1 || 64
|-
!62
| The Huertas Brothers/The Invaders || 1 || 63
|-
!63
| Puerto Rican Express || 2 || 58
|-
!rowspan=2|64
| Mohammed Hussein and El Vigilante || 1 || 58
|-
| Puerto Rican Express || 1 || 58
|-
!65
| Dan Kroffat and Tama || 1 || 57
|-
!rowspan=2|66
| La Evolución Hardcore || 1 || 56
|-
| Rico Suave and Eddie Watts || 1 || 56
|-
!rowspan=3|67
| Los Mercenarios || 1 || 55
|-
| The Islanders || 1 || 55
|-
| Zona 101 || 1 || 55
|-
!68
| Mohammed Hussein and The Tahitian Warrior || 3 || 52
|-
!69
| Chris Joel and Demolition X || 1 || 50
|-
!rowspan=4|70
| El Cuervo and El Hombre Bestia Angel || 1 || 49
|-
| El Nuevo Mando || 1 || 49
|-
| Los Nuevos Nenes de las Nenas || 1 || 49
|-
| The Samoans || 1 || 49
|-
!71
|Los Aéreos || 1 || 48
|-
!72
| Diabólico and Rico Suave || 2 || 45
|-
!rowspan=3|73
| BJ and Joe Bravo || 1 || 42
|-
| Los Compadres || 1 || 42
|-
| The Continental Dream || 1 || 42
|-
!74
| Carlos Colón and Invader I || 1 || 40
|-
!75
| The Starr Corporation || 3 || 39
|-
!76
| The Southern Rockers || 1 || 38
|-
!77
| Mohammed Hussein and Doug Sanders || 1 || 36
|-
!rowspan=6|78
| Agente Bruno and Rico Suave || 1 || 35
|-
| Black Pain and Mad Man Manson || 1 || 35
|-
|  || 1 || 35
|-
| Gino de la Serra and Pierre Martel || 1 || 35
|-
| Los Arcángeles || 1 || 35
|-
| The International Males  || 1 || 35
|-
!rowspan=3|79
| Idol Stevens and Abbad || 1 || 30
|-
| El Bronco and Diamante Dominicano || 1 || 30
|-
| Scorpio and Mr. Tempest || 1 || 30
|-
!rowspan=2|80
| Black Gordman and Medic I || 1 || 29
|-
| Invader I and Pierre Martel || 1 || 29
|-
!rowspan=3|81
| Alex Montalvo and Chicky Starr || 1 || 28
|-
| Black Boy and José Rivera, Jr. || 1 || 28
|-
| Salt 'n' Pepper || 1 || 28
|-
!82
| Jason the Terrible and Steve Strong || 1 || 27
|-
!83
| The New Delta Force || 1 || 26
|-
!84
| The Hunters || 1 || 25
|-
!85
| The Texas Outlaws || 2 || 21
|-
!rowspan=11|86
| Bouncer Bruno and Dutch Mantel || 1 || 21
|-
| Chicano and Idol Stevens || 1 || 21
|-
| D'Jour Twins || 1 || 21
|-
| El Bronco (4) and Ciclón Salvadoreño || 1 || 21
|-
| El Bronco and Super Gladiador || 1 || 21
|-
| El Gran Mendoza and Billy Travis || 1 || 21
|-
| El Hijo de Ray González and Mike Mendoza || 1 || 21
|-
| Eric Alexander and Rico Suave || 1 || 21
|-
| Huracán Castillo and Pierre Martel || 1 || 21
|-
| Noriega and Jose Rivera, Jr. || 1 || 21
|-
| Ricky Santana and Rico Suave || 1 || 21
|-
!rowspan=5|87
| El Nuevo Mando || 1 || 20
|-
| Gran Apollo and Pierre Martel || 1 || 20
|-
| Puerto Rican Express || 1 || 20
|-
| Hercules Ayala and King Tonga || 1 || 20
|-
| The New American Family || 1 || 20
|-
!rowspan=2|88
| Kengo Kimura and Hiro Sasaki || 1 || 19
|-
| Mr. Pogo and TNT || 1 || 19
|-
!89
| Gilbert and Pedro Portillo || 1 || 18
|-
!90
| The Rastamen || 1 || 15
|-
!91
| Zona Urbana || 2 || 14
|-
!rowspan=2|92
| Rex King and Ricky Santana || 2 || 13
|-
| The Wildcats || 2 || 13
|-
!93
| La Conexión Comunista || 1 || 13
|-
!rowspan=2|94
| Tommy Diablo and Johnny Ringo || 1 || 7
|-
| Brent Dail and Ricky Santana || 1 || 7
|-
!95
| Heartbreaker Adonis (4) and Doug Masters || 1 || 5
|-
!96
| Super Gladiador and Brent Dail || 1 || 2
|-
!rowspan=3|97
| America's Most Wanted || 1 || 1
|-
| Carly Colón and Eddie Colón || 1 || 1
|-
| The Texas Hangmen || 1 || 1
|-
!rowspan=2|98
| Ángel Mexicano and Fidel Sierra || 1 || <1
|-
| Viper and El Rebelde || 1 || <1

By wrestler 
{| class="wikitable sortable" style="text-align: center"
|-
!Rank
!Team
!No. ofreigns
!Combined days
|-
!rowspan=2|1
| Lightning || 29 || 1,731
|-
| Thunder || 29 || 1,731
|-
!3
| La Revolucion II || 9 || 1,146
|-
!rowspan=2|4
| Terry Funk || 2 || 1,061
|-
| Dory Funk, Jr. || 2 || 1,061
|-
!5
| La Revolucion I || 7 || 809
|-
!6
| Ricky Santana || 11 || 800
|-
!7
| Invader I || 15 || 761
|-
!8
| Huracán Castillo, Jr. || 15 || 639
|-
!9
| Ray González || 10 || 635
|-
!rowspan=2|10
| Chris Youngblood || 7 || 580
|-
| Mark Youngblood || 7 || 580
|-
!11
| José Rivera || 4 || 499
|-
!rowspan=2|12
| Khaos || 2 || 498
|-
| Abbadon || 2 || 498
|-
!13
| Chris Joel || 12 || 462
|-
!14
| El Bronco || 10 || 445
|-
!15
| Shane/Glamour Boy Shane || 3 || 428
|-
!rowspan=2|16
| Mike Davis || 2 || 413
|-
| Tommy Lane || 2 || 413
|-
!17
| Rico Suave || 10 || 380
|-
!18
| Mohammed Hussein || 9 || 357
|-
!19
| L.A. Smooth/The Tahitian Warrior || 9 || 348
|-
!21
| Carlos Colón || 3 || 311
|-
!22
| Killer || 4 || 309
|-
!23
| Psycho || 3 || 308
|-
!24
| Chicky/Chicky Starr || 7 || 272
|-
!25
| Medic I || 3 || 270
|-
!26
| Viper/Bronco III || 9 || 249
|-
!27
| Ron Starr || 5 || 242
|-
!28
| Chicano || 6 || 229
|-
!29
| Mr. Pogo || 5 || 209
|-
!30
| Medic II || 2 || 206
|-
!rowspan=2|31
| style="background:#ffe6bd;"|Steve Joel † || 1 || +
|- 
| style="background:#ffe6bd;"|Jay Vélez † || 1 || +
|-
!rowspan=2|32
| Niche || 4 || 196
|-
| Lynx || 4 || 196
|-
!33
| Kendo Nagasaki || 4 || 190
|-
!34
| Sean/Sean Morley || 3 || 189
|-
!35
| Noriega || 6 || 183
|-
!rowspan=2|36
| Ash || 2 || 176
|-
| William de la Vega || 2 || 176
|-
!37
| Invader II || 2 || 174
|-
!38
| Miguel Pérez, Jr. || 4 || 169
|-
!rowspan=2|39
| Bart Batten || 4 || 164
|-
| Brad Batten || 4 || 164
|-
!40
| Afa Jr. || 3 || 157
|-
!rowspan=2|41
| Idol Stevens || 4 || 148
|-
| Rex King || 4 || 148
|-
!42
| Bouncer Bruno/Agente Bruno || 3 || 140
|-
!43
| Pedro Morales || 1 || 133
|-
!rowspan=2|44
| Abbuda Dein || 2 || 123
|-
| Rip Rogers || 2 || 123
|-
!45
| Cuban Assassin || 2 || 119
|-
!46
| Super Gladiador || 3 || 118
|-
!47
| Invader III || 2 || 117
|-
!rowspan=2|48
| Butch Miller || 2 || 115
|-
| Luke Williams || 2 || 115
|-
!49
| Tim Arson || 2 || 104
|-
!50
| Xix Xavant || 1 || 104
|-
!51
| Heartbreaker Adonis || 4 || 100
|-
!rowspan=2|52
| Black Pain || 2 || 100
|-
| Hannibal || 2 || 100
|-
!53
| Heartbreaker Apollo || 3 || 95
|-
!rowspan=3|54
| Abbad || 2 || 85
|-
| Butch Miller || 2 || 85
|-
| Luke Williams || 2 || 85
|-
!rowspan=2|55
| Moondog Rex || 1 || 84
|-
| Moondog Spot || 1 || 84
|-
!56
| Carly Colón || 2 || 77
|-
!57
| Shawn Spears || 1 || 77
|-
!rowspan=2|58
| Al Perez || 1 || 76
|-
| Joe Savoldi || 1 || 76
|-
!rowspan=2|59
| El Cuervo || 3 || 73
|-
| Mike Mendoza || 3 || 73
|-
!60
| Doug Masters || 3 || 71
|-
!rowspan=2|61
| Renegade del Infierno I/Greco || 2 || 71
|-
| Renegade del Infierno II/Romano || 2 || 71
|-
!62
| Pierre Martel || 3 || 70
|-
!rowspan=3|63
| Cold Warrant || 2 || 70
|-
| Death Warrant || 2 || 70
|-
| James Storm || 2 || 70
|-
!rowspan=2|64
| Al Costello || 2 || 69
|-
| Don Kent || 2 || 69
|-
!65
| Cassidy Riley || 1 || 69
|-
!66
| Jerry Morrow || 1 || 64
|-
!rowspan=2|67
| Dan Kroffat || 1 || 57
|-
| Tama || 1 || 57
|-
!68
| BJ || 3 || 56
|-
!rowspan=2|69
| Afa || 1 || 49
|-
| Sika || 1 || 49
|-
!rowspan=2|70
| Carlitos || 1 || 48
|-
| Hiram Tua || 1 || 48
|-
!rowspan=2|71
| Rick Valentine || 1 || 42
|-
| Lance Idol || 1 || 42
|-
!72
| Steve Doll || 1 || 38
|-
!rowspan=3|73
| Christopher Daniels || 1 || 35
|-
| Gino de la Serra || 1 || 35
|-
| Kevin Quinn || 1 || 35
|-
!rowspan=2|74
| Mr. Tempest || 1 || 30
|-
| Scorpio || 1 || 30
|-
!75
| Black Gordman || 1 || 29
|-
!rowspan=2|76
| Jason the Terrible || 1 || 27
|-
| Steve Strong || 1 || 27
|-
!rowspan=6|77
| Billy Travis || 1 || 21
|- 
| Ciclón Salvadoreño || 1 || 21
|-
| Dave D'Jour || 1 || 21
|-
| David D'Jour || 1 || 21
|-
| El Gran Mendoza ||1 || 21
|-
| Huracán Castillo, Sr. || 1 || 21
|-
!rowspan=3|78
| Kengo Kimura || 1 || 19
|-
| Hiro Sasaki || 1 || 19
|-
| TNT || 1 || 19
|-
!rowspan=2|79
| Dobbie Gillis || 2 || 13
|-
| Mike Anthony || 2 || 13
|-
!80
| Brent Dail || 1 || 7
|-
!rowspan=3|81
| Chris Harris || 1 || 1
|-
| Eddie Colón || 1 || 1
|-
| Skull Von Krush || 1 || 1
|-
!rowspan=2|82
| Ángel Mexicano || 1 || <1
|-
| Fidel Sierra || 1 || <1

References
Footnotes

Bibliography

External links
Wrestling Information Archive
Cagematch.de
Wrestlingdata.com

Tag team wrestling championships
World Wrestling Council championships
World professional wrestling championships